Giovanni Fietta (born 14 November 1984) is an Italian professional footballer who plays as a midfielder for  club Pro Patria.

Club career

Treviso
Born in Asolo, in the Province of Treviso, Veneto, Fietta was a youth product of Treviso Football Club. He won the promotion to Serie B in 2003. However Treviso loaned Fietta back to lower divisions, for Serie C2 club Ivrea. Fietta returned to Treviso in 2004, which he briefly played in 2004–05 Serie B season. In 2005, he left the club again, for Serie C1 club Pizzighettone in co-ownership deal. Treviso also relegated in 2005–06 Serie A season. in June 2006 Pizzighettone purchased Fietta outright for undisclosed fee, however in July 2006 Treviso bought Fietta back for €45,000. That season he made 24 Serie B appearances. In July 2007, Fietta, Marco Zaninelli and Alfonso Camorani were signed by fellow Serie B club Spezia in temporary deal.

Cremonese
In January 2008 Fietta was signed by the third division club Cremonese in another co-ownership deal, for €170,000. In June 2009 Treviso bought back Fietta. However, due to the bankruptcy of Treviso, Fietta returned to Cremonese on a free transfer. On 16 July 2012 Fietta signed a new 1-year contract with the Lombard side.

Como
On 1 July 2013 Fietta became a free agent. On 3 September 2013 he was signed by the third division club Como in 2-year contract. Como finished as the losing quarter-finalists in the promotion playoffs.

Pro Patria
On 10 July 2018, he joined Serie C club Pro Patria.

Honours
 Serie C1: 2003 (Treviso)

References

External links
 Profile (2006–07 season) at La Gazzetta dello Sport 
 AIC profile (data by football.it) 
 
 

1984 births
Living people
People from Asolo
Sportspeople from the Province of Treviso
Italian footballers
Association football midfielders
Serie B players
Serie C players
Treviso F.B.C. 1993 players
A.S.D. Calcio Ivrea players
A.S. Pizzighettone players
Spezia Calcio players
U.S. Cremonese players
Como 1907 players
A.C. Renate players
Aurora Pro Patria 1919 players
Footballers from Veneto